A dental engine is a large chair-side appliance (often including the chair itself) for use in a dentist's office. At minimum, a dental engine serves as a source of mechanical or pneumatic power for one or more handpieces.

Typically, it will also include a small faucet and a spit-sink, which the patient can use for rinsing, as well as one or more suction hoses, and a compressed air/irrigation water nozzle for blowing or washing debris clear of the work area in the patient's mouth.

The equipment possibly includes an ultrasonic cleaning appliance, as well as a small table to hold the instrument tray, a worklight, and possibly a computer monitor or display.

Due to their design and usage, dental engines are a potential source of infection from several kinds of bacteria, including Legionella pneumophila .

Gallery

References

Dental equipment